The mizwad (mezoued, mizwid) (Tunisian Arabic : مِزْود; plural مَزاود mazāwid, literally "sack," “bag,” or “food pouch”) is a  type of bagpipes played in Tunisia, . The instrument consists of a skin bag made from ewe's leather, with a joined double-chanter, terminating in two cow horns, similar to a hornpipe (instrument).This instrument is played with a single-reed. 

The ethnomusicologist Anthony Baines stated that the term "zukra" is also used for this instrument, however, bagpipe enthusiast, Oliver Seeler, states that this connection is incorrect. While the Zukra may be similar, it is not the same, It is instead a wind instrument in Libya, which is similar to the mizwad though not the same.

Mizwad is a popular type of traditional music in Tunisia which incorporates a type of Tunisian drum called the Darbouka as well as the Mizwad. This music was originally considered the music of the countryside and the working class. It is often played at weddings and formal parties, and it also has its own traditional dances which are said to make people enter a trance-like state.

Mizwad is one of the most popular in tunisia played along with the drum

See also
Habbān
Mijwiz
Erke

References

Bagpipes
North African musical instruments
Algerian musical instruments
Tunisian musical instruments
Arabic musical instruments